All Saints' Church is a church in Tinwell, Rutland, England. It is a Grade II* listed building.

History

The church dates from the 13th century but the windows date from the 15th century. The church is made up of a vestry, clerestory, tower, north porch, nave and chancel. The church has an unusual saddleback roof. The church was restored in the 19th century.

The chancel contains the grave of Elizabeth Cecil who married Hugh Alington of Tinwell, and was the sister of William Cecil, 1st Baron Burghley.

On 8 July 1944, two C47s collided after taking-off from RAF Spanhoe for an exercise. One crew member managed to parachute safely but eight others and 26 Polish paratroops of the Polish 1st Independent Parachute Brigade died in the crash.  All those killed are commemorated in the church.

References

Tinwell
Tinwell